The 1997 Atlantic 10 Conference Baseball Championship was held at Bear Stadium in Boyertown, Pennsylvania from May 15 through 17. The double elimination tournament featured the top two regular-season finishers of each of the conference's six-team divisions. West Division second seed Virginia Tech defeated Massachusetts in the title game to win the tournament for the first time, earning the Atlantic 10's automatic bid to the 1997 NCAA Tournament.

Seeding and format 
Each division's top teams, based on winning percentage in the 21-game regular season schedule, qualified for the field. In the opening round of the four-team double-elimination format, the East Division champion played the West Division runner-up, and vice versa.

Bracket

All-Tournament Team 
The following players were named to the All-Tournament Team. Virginia Tech catcher Barry Gauch, one of five Hokies selected, was named Most Outstanding Player.

Massachusetts's shortstop Brad Gorrie, who was also selected in 1996 was named to the team for the second time.

References 

Atlantic 10 Conference tournament
Atlantic 10 Conference Baseball Tournament
Atlantic 10 Conference baseball tournament
Atlantic 10 Conference baseball tournament
Baseball in Pennsylvania
College sports in Pennsylvania
History of Berks County, Pennsylvania
Sports competitions in Pennsylvania
Sports in the Delaware Valley
Tourist attractions in Berks County, Pennsylvania